The Butcher is a 2006 horror film directed by Edward Gorsuch. It centers on a group of teenagers who discover a murderer living in the middle of nowhere after crashing their car.

Plot
Six college friends embark on a road trip to Las Vegas, and during a foolish and unfamiliar shortcut, become involved in a serious car accident in a small, unknown town. One of the girls in the vehicle dies, and is accompanied by a friend while the others go looking for help in the small town. They find an old house in the woods, which is inhabited by a family of psychopaths, who proceed to chase and hunt down the group of kids.

Cast
 Catherine Wreford as Rachel
 Tom Nagel as Adam
 Myiea Coy as Sophie
 Alan Ritchson as Mark
 Ashley Hawkins as Atlanta
 Tiffany Kristensen as Liz
 Annie MacKay as Angel
Conner Gorsuch as Little Angel
 Bill Jacobson as Franklin Mayhew
 Hazell Dean as Sarah
 April Lang as Mrs. Mayhew
 Nick Stellate as Sheriff
 Pej Vahdat as Chip
 April Gilbert as Sarah

Reception
Mitchell Hattaway, writing for DVD Verdict, gave a negative review. He said that "The Butcher was shot on cheap digital videotape, and the disc's transfer is flat, dull, and noisy. There is little channel separation in the stereo soundtrack, and dialogue sounds tinny and canned. An assortment of previews is the only bonus feature. I would be remiss if I didn't give the filmmakers props for their one original idea: I'm pretty sure this is the only movie in the history of cinema in which a character is killed by being drowned in a bathtub filled with strawberry Nestlé's Quik. Eat your heart out, Mr. Hitchcock." HorrorTalk wrote that "Right off the bat, The Butcher is going to be a love-it or hate-it film for most, due to the fact that its sole purpose of being nothing more than a torture horror film at its most basic level." DreadCentral wrote that: "Originally entitled The Harvest, Lionsgate realized that was just too generic and changed it to the almost nearly as generic The Butcher. Considering the film doesn't seem to have an original idea in its body or any intention of even trying to come up with an original idea or the ability to do anything even remotely creative with its recycled material, a more fitting title would have been The Nevada Wrong Turn Massacre."

References

External links

2006 horror films
Direct-to-video horror films
2006 films
2000s English-language films